This is a list of currently enthroned monarchs sorted by length of service.

This list includes monarchs who do not reign over entire nations, such as Muhammad V of Kelantan, but does not include former monarchs and pretenders, such as Simeon II of Bulgaria, ex officio monarchs such as Emmanuel Macron who in his capacity as President of France is also Co-Prince of Andorra, monarchs without physical territories such as the Prince and Grand Master of the Sovereign Military Order of Malta, constituent monarchs such as the traditional African rulers, or monarchs whose position is unofficial, such as the 14th Dalai Lama, Tenzin Gyatso.

Hassanal Bolkiah is currently the longest-reigning monarch, having been Sultan of Brunei since 5 October 1967. He became the longest-reigning monarch upon the death of Elizabeth II of the United Kingdom on 8 September 2022. To break the record of the reign of Louis XIV, he must rule until 24 January 2040, at age 93 years and 193 days.

List

See also
Records of heads of state
List of longest-reigning monarchs
List of shortest-reigning monarchs
List of current heads of state and government
List of current state leaders by date of assumption of office
List of oldest living state leaders

Notes

References

Monarchs
Current